Charles Robert Eskridge III (born April 23, 1963) is a United States district judge of the United States District Court for the Southern District of Texas.

Education 

Eskridge earned his Bachelor of Science, magna cum laude, from Trinity University and his Juris Doctor, summa cum laude, from Pepperdine University School of Law. While in law school, he served as an editor of the Pepperdine Law Review.

Career 

Upon graduation from law school, Eskridge served as a law clerk to Judge Charles Clark of the United States Court of Appeals for the Fifth Circuit and to Justice Byron White of the Supreme Court of the United States. From 1994 to 2019, he was in private practice. He previously spent over two decades in the Houston, Texas, office of Susman Godfrey and then was partner at Quinn Emanuel Urquhart & Sullivan. Eskridge serves as an adjunct professor at the University of Houston Law Center, teaching a course on the origins of the federal constitution.

Federal judicial service 

On May 3, 2019, President Donald Trump announced his intent to nominate Eskridge to serve as a United States district judge for the United States District Court for the Southern District of Texas. On May 13, 2019, his nomination was sent to the Senate. President Trump nominated Eskridge to the seat vacated by Judge Gray H. Miller, who assumed senior status on December 9, 2018. On June 5, 2019, a hearing on his nomination was held before the Senate Judiciary Committee. On June 27, 2019, his nomination was reported out of committee by a 15–7 vote. On October 16, 2019, the United States Senate invoked cloture on his nomination by a 61–29 vote. His nomination was confirmed later that day by a 61–31 vote. He received his judicial commission on October 17, 2019. He took his seat on October 22, 2019.

Memberships

He has been a member of the Federalist Society since August 2013.

See also 
 List of law clerks of the Supreme Court of the United States (Seat 6)

References

External links 
 

1963 births
Living people
20th-century American lawyers
21st-century American judges
21st-century American lawyers
Federalist Society members
Judges of the United States District Court for the Southern District of Texas
Law clerks of the Supreme Court of the United States
People from Cleveland
Pepperdine University School of Law alumni
Texas lawyers
Trinity University (Texas) alumni
United States district court judges appointed by Donald Trump
University of Houston faculty